Elections to the Supreme Soviet were held in the Soviet Union on 16 March 1958.

Electoral system
Candidates had to be nominated by the Communist Party of the Soviet Union (CPSU) or by a public organisation. However, all public organisations were controlled by the party and were subservient to a 1931 law that required them to accept party rule. The CPSU itself remained the only legal one in the country.

Voters could vote against the CPSU candidate, but could only do so by using polling booths, whereas votes for the party could be cast simply by submitting a blank ballot. Turnout was required to be over 50% for the election to be valid.

Candidates
CPSU candidates accounted for around three quarters of the nominees, whilst many of the others were members of Komsomol.

Results

Soviet of the Union

Soviet of Nationalities

References

Legislative elections in the Soviet Union
1958 elections in the Soviet Union
One-party elections
Single-candidate elections
March 1958 events in Europe 
March 1958 events in Asia 
Soviet Union
Soviet Union